Lake Ikazn is a lake in the Braslau Lakes National Park of northern Belarus. It liea about 14 km east of Braslau and has an area of 2.38 km ² and length of 2.97 km . The maximum width is 0.8 km and its coastline is 12.7 km in length.  The greatest depth is 8.4 m. 
The water volume is 7.94 mln m ³ and the catchment area is 25.3 km ². The slopes of the valley are 12–15 m are  forested towards the southeast. The lake contains 2 small islands with a total area of 1.2 hectares.

References

Блакітная кніга Беларусі. — Мн.: БелЭн, 1994.

Ikazn